John Kyme or Cayme (by 1519 – 25 April 1585), of London and Lewes, Sussex, was an English politician.

He was a Member (MP) of the Parliament of England for Helston in April 1554.

References

1585 deaths
People from Lewes
English MPs 1554
Year of birth uncertain
Members of the Parliament of England for Helston